Championship Wrestling is a professional wrestling video game released by Epyx for the Apple II in 1986. Ports were released for the Commodore 64, and Atari ST.

Gameplay
The game includes eight fictional wrestlers, including The Berserker, Purple Hays, H. Manslayer, Zeke Weasel, Prince Vicious, Colonel Rooski, K.C. Colossus, and Zanto Klaw.

Development
Championship Wrestling was originally intended as a WWF game, but the licence never materialized.

References

1986 video games
Apple II games
Atari ST games
Commodore 64 games
Epyx games
Professional wrestling games
U.S. Gold games
Video games developed in the United States
Multiplayer and single-player video games